Otuz-Adyr is a village in Kara-Suu District of Osh Region of Kyrgyzstan. It is the administrative center of the Otuz-Adyr rural community (ayyl aymagy). Its population was 6,597 in 2021.

Population

References

Populated places in Osh Region